Neumichtis expulsa is a moth of the family Noctuidae. It is found in Australia, including Tasmania.

The wingspan is about 30 mm.

References

Cuculliinae
Moths described in 1852